The discography of American country pop and cajun artist Hunter Hayes consists of ten studio albums, one compilation album, five independently released albums, one live extended play, and ten singles. Hayes began his career as a songwriter with Universal Music Publishing Group, moving to Nashville in 2008 and co-writing the song "Play" on Rascal Flatts' 2010 album, Nothing Like This.

After signing to Atlantic Nashville, Hayes released his debut single "Storm Warning" in May 2011. The song preceded his eponymous debut major-label album, Hunter Hayes, which was released October 11, 2011. The album's second single, "Wanted", topped the Hot Country Songs chart and also crossed over to pop and adult contemporary radio. "Somebody's Heartbreak" was the third single from Hunter Hayes, and reached the top of the Country Airplay chart. In June 2013, the album was reissued as Hunter Hayes (Encore), and the collective sales from both editions propelled the album to the No. 1 spot on the Country Albums chart. Two additional singles were issued from Encore: the No. 2-peaking "I Want Crazy" and the re-recorded Jason Mraz duet version of "Everybody's Got Somebody but Me".

Hayes's second album, Storyline, was released May 6, 2014, and debuted at Nos. 1 and 3, respectively, on the Top Country Albums and Billboard 200 album charts with a debut sales week of 69 000 copies sold in the US. The album was preceded in January 2014 by lead single "Invisible", which peaked at No. 4 on the country charts due to significant sales and streaming following the song's debut at the 56th Annual Grammy Awards. "Tattoo" was released in June 2014 as the album's second single. He co-wrote the 2020 single "Hard Dirt" and 2021 single "Been a Minute" by the Hunter Brothers.

Albums

Studio albums

Live albums

Compilation albums

Extended plays

Singles

As main artist

Promotional singles

Other charted songs

Music videos

Miscellaneous

Other appearances

Writing credits

Notes

References

Discographies of American artists
Country music discographies